This is a list of commercial banks in Burundi. 

  Banque Commerciale du Burundi (Burundi Commercial Bank) (BANCOBU)
 Banque de Gestion et de Financement (Banque de Gestion et de Financement) (BGF)
 Banque Burundaise pour le Commerce et l'Investissement (Burundi Bank of Commerce and Investment) (BBCI)
 Banque de Credit de Bujumbura (Bujumbura Credit Bank) (BCB) - A member of the Bank of Africa Group  
 FinBank Burundi (FINBANK)
 Interbank Burundi (IBB)
 Ecobank Burundi (ECOBANK)
 Diamond Trust Bank Burundi (DTB) 
 KCB Burundi (KCB)
 CRDB Bank Burundi (CRDB)
 The Women’s Investment and Development Bank (BIDF) (BIDF)
 Banque d’investissement pour les Jeunes (BIJE)

See also

 Bank of the Republic of Burundi
 List of banks in Africa
 List of companies based in Burundi

References

External links
  Website of Bank of the Republic of Burundi (French)

 
Banks
Burundi
Burundi